Varoš is a part of Prilep, 20 years ago, this used to be a village, until it joined Prilep, making it the only former village in Prilep to be inhabited.

A legend says that in the past there were 77 churches.

References

Prilep